Andersen v. Treat, 172 U.S. 24 (1898), was a United States Supreme Court case in which John Andersen was convicted of the murder of William Wallace Sanders, who was his mate on the ship Olive Pecket.  Andersen was found guilty and sentenced to death, but petitioned the District Court of the United States for the Eastern District of Virginia for a writ of habeas corpus, under the claim that he had been deprived of his right to counsel under the Sixth Amendment to the United States Constitution. Chief Justice Fuller delivered the opinion of the Court affirming the order of the lower court.

See also 
 List of United States Supreme Court cases, volume 172

External links
 

United States Supreme Court cases
United States Supreme Court cases of the Fuller Court
1898 in United States case law
United States admiralty case law
United States habeas corpus case law